Goszapovednika is a rural locality (a settlement) in Kalininsky Selsoviet of Volodarsky District, Astrakhan Oblast, Russia. The population was 7 as of 2010.

References 

Rural localities in Volodarsky District, Astrakhan Oblast